The 2002 Pep Boys presents the Pennsylvania 500 was the 20th stock car race of the 2002 NASCAR Winston Cup Series and the 30th iteration of the event. The race was held on Sunday, July 28, 2002, in Long Pond, Pennsylvania, at Pocono Raceway, a 2.5 miles (4.0 km) triangular permanent course. The race was shortened from its scheduled from its scheduled 200 laps to 175 due to darkness caused by delays during the race. At race's end, Bill Elliott, driving for Evernham Motorsports, would pull away during the late stages of the race to win his 21st career NASCAR Winston Cup Series win and his first of the season. To fill out the podium, Kurt Busch of Roush Racing and Sterling Marlin of Chip Ganassi Racing would finish second and third, respectively.

Background 

The race was held at Pocono Raceway, which is a three-turn superspeedway located in Long Pond, Pennsylvania. The track hosts two annual NASCAR Sprint Cup Series races, as well as one Xfinity Series and Camping World Truck Series event. Until 2019, the track also hosted an IndyCar Series race.

Pocono Raceway is one of a very few NASCAR tracks not owned by either Speedway Motorsports, Inc. or International Speedway Corporation. It is operated by the Igdalsky siblings Brandon, Nicholas, and sister Ashley, and cousins Joseph IV and Chase Mattioli, all of whom are third-generation members of the family-owned Mattco Inc, started by Joseph II and Rose Mattioli.

Outside of the NASCAR races, the track is used throughout the year by Sports Car Club of America (SCCA) and motorcycle clubs as well as racing schools and an IndyCar race. The triangular oval also has three separate infield sections of racetrack – North Course, East Course and South Course. Each of these infield sections use a separate portion of the tri-oval to complete the track. During regular non-race weekends, multiple clubs can use the track by running on different infield sections. Also some of the infield sections can be run in either direction, or multiple infield sections can be put together – such as running the North Course and the South Course and using the tri-oval to connect the two.

Entry list 

 (R) denotes rookie driver.

Practice

First practice 
The first practice session was held on Friday, July 26, at 11:20 AM EST, and would last for 2 hours.

Second practice 
The second practice session was held on Saturday, July 27, at 9:30 AM EST, and would last for 45 minutes.

Third and final practice 
The third and final practice session, sometimes referred to as Happy Hour, was held on Saturday, July 27, at 11:15 AM EST, and would last for 45 minutes.

Qualifying 
Qualifying was held on Friday, July 26, at 3:05 PM EST. Each driver would have two laps to set a fastest time; the fastest of the two would count as their official qualifying lap. Positions 1-36 would be decided on time, while positions 37-43 would be based on provisionals. Six spots are awarded by the use of provisionals based on owner's points. The seventh is awarded to a past champion who has not otherwise qualified for the race. If no past champ needs the provisional, the next team in the owner points will be awarded a provisional.

Carl Long was the only driver to fail to qualify.

Full qualifying results

Race

Lap 1 crash
On the first lap, outside pole sitter Ricky Rudd took the lead from pole sitter Bill Elliott in turn 1. Behind the leaders where a whole pack of cars were racing side by side, Rusty Wallace, who started 9th, was running in 10th when Steve Park, who started 11th, began to peak to Wallace's outside. Wallace went up to block Park but instead Wallace went across Park's nose and Wallace hit the wall. Park turned left to avoid Wallace but instead ran into his Dale Earnhardt Inc. teammate in Dale Earnhardt Jr. and Park spun across Jr's right front. Both Park and Jr. began to spin and slide through the wet infield grass that was slippery due to the rain that fell. Park's car tipped towards the passenger side of the car and Jr. ended up bulldozing Park's car into the inside of an old-fashioned highway guardrail barrier head-on and then with the passenger side and ended up breaking the barrier. Park's car ramped up over Jr's hood and Park flipped over about 2 times before coming to a rest on the driver's side door. Jr. got out of his car in a big hurry and ran over to check on his teammate to see if he was ok. The caution flew and Ricky Rudd led the cars back to the line and the red flag was shown shortly after as rescue crews attempted to get Park out of his car. About 2 minutes after the crash, the rescue crews with the help of Dale Earnhardt Jr. were able to get Park out of his car. Park was uninjured and he and Jr. walked together to a waiting ambulance to take them to the infield care center. The race was red-flagged for a total of 65 minutes due to the crews attempting to repair the broken barrier.

Rest of race
After the barrier was repaired, the red flag was lifted. The race restarted on lap 9 with Ricky Rudd leading the race. On the next lap, Bill Elliott took the lead from Rudd. On lap 24, the race was red-flagged again due to rain. The race was red-flagged for 2 hours and 2 minutes due to the rainy weather. Once the rain cleared and the track was dried, the race got back underway on lap 33 with Joe Nemechek as the race leader. On lap 39, Nemechek lost the lead to Sterling Marlin. Green flag pitstops began on lap 62 with Ricky Rudd, Elliott Sadler, and Robby Gordon taking the leads before they made their pit stops. Once everything cycled through, Marlin got his lead back. On lap 98, another cycle of green flag pit stops began again with Kurt Busch and Dave Blaney taking the leads before they made their pit stops. Marlin got his lead back after everything cycled through. The third caution flew on lap 105 when Mike Skinner's car stalled in turn 3. The race restarted on lap 110 with Marlin as the leader. During that green flag period, NASCAR decided to shorten the race from 200 laps to 175 laps due to darkness since the racetrack does not have lights. Green flag pitstops began again on lap 136 with Jeff Burton, Kurt Busch, and Jimmie Johnson switching the lead. With 37 laps to go, the 4th caution flew when Jeremy Mayfield crashed in turn 2. Sterling Marlin led the field to the restart with 30 to go. On the next lap, the 5th and final caution flew when Jerry Nadeau crashed in turn 2. With 24 to go, Marlin led the field to the restart. With 19 to go, Bill Elliott passed Sterling Marlin to take the lead and his first win of 2002. Kurt Busch, Sterling Marlin, Dale Jarrett, and Ryan Newman rounded out the top 5 while Kevin Harvick, Tony Stewart, Matt Kenseth, Terry Labonte, and Ricky Rudd rounded out the top 10.

Race results

References 

2002 NASCAR Winston Cup Series
NASCAR races at Pocono Raceway
July 2002 sports events in the United States
2002 in sports in Pennsylvania